Dasha Burns (born March 1, 1992) is an American journalist. She is a national correspondent at NBC News, and where she has worked since 2016.

Early life and education 
Dasha Burns grew up in San Diego. In college she was producer at CalTV, acted in university plays on campus, and served as a Matsui Center fellow at the United Nations Information Center Washington in 2014.

Career 
After graduating, through 2016, Burns worked as a media writer and strategist for a consulting agency, while writing opinion pieces for CNN.

From May 2016, Burns worked as an associate producer and then producer for the NBC television morning news and talk program Weekend Today. In March 2019 she became a television reporter for NBC News, reporting from the field. In February 2022, Burns was promoted from the County to County project, to correspondent focusing on the 2022 United States elections in Pennsylvania and Ohio.

In October 2022, Burns was the first journalist to have an in-depth face to face interview with Pennsylvania senatorial candidate John Fetterman since his stroke. National Review reported that Fetterman's wife, Gisele Barreto Fetterman, also accused the reporter of ableism and said that Burns should face "consequences" for the interview. After Fetterman debated Republican candidate Mehmet Oz, Fox News cited several people who said that Burns was owed an apology from Gisele Fetterman and members of the media.

Personal life 
In March and April 2020, Burns shared her experience of missing work due to contracting the COVID-19 virus. She married her husband, Ben, in 2019.

References

External links

1992 births
21st-century American journalists
21st-century American women writers
American women television journalists
Living people
NBC News people
University of California, Berkeley alumni